Jonathan Viscosi (born March 18, 1991) is a Canadian soccer player who plays for Swedish Superettan club Dalkurd.

Career

Professional

After spending 4 seasons in England, including National League clubs Chester and Southport,. Also had a spell at Tiverton Town in the Southern League. Viscosi trialled with Ykkönen club Turun Palloseura, but opted to sign with Oskarshamns AIK in Sweden.

FC TPS
Viscosi would sign with FC TPS in January 2017. After playing the season as the first choice goalkeeper, he indicated that he would wish to stay into the 2018 season. Upon completion of the 2017 season, Viscosi would sign a one year extension for the 2018 season after starting every match, helping TPS earn promotion back to the Veikkausliiga in 2018, and being named the Ykkönen's best goalkeeper.

San Antonio FC
Viscosi returned to North America in 2019, signing with San Antonio FC of the USL Championship. Viscosi would play a backup role to Matt Cardone in the 2019 season, only starting one game.

IK Sirius
After one season in the USL, Viscosi would sign with Allsvenskan club IK Sirius for the 2020 season. Viscosi would be the backup goalkeeper at the club for the 2020 season, earning 3 starts.

Dalkurd
After one season with Sirius, Viscosi would sign with Ettan club Dalkurd on a three year contract.

Personal life
Viscosi was born in Canada and is of Italian descent.

References

1991 births
Living people
Association football goalkeepers
Soccer players from Ottawa
Canadian soccer players
Canadian people of Italian descent
Veikkausliiga players
Tiverton Town F.C. players
Canadian expatriate soccer players
Canadian expatriate sportspeople in England
Turun Palloseura footballers
Oskarshamns AIK players
Southport F.C. players
Chester F.C. players
Brackley Town F.C. players
Des Moines Menace players
Ottawa Fury (2005–2013) players
Albany BWP Highlanders players
San Antonio FC players
USL Championship players
Buffalo Bulls men's soccer players
Ottawa South United players